Halogilat railway station is one of eleven minor railway station on the Western Sabah Railway Line located in Halogilat, Beaufort, Sabah, Malaysia.

Track upgrade 
On 19 November 2021, Malaysia's Deputy Transport Minister Henry Sum Agong announced the project to upgrade the Halogilat-Tenom railway track is expected to be ready by early 2022.

References

External links 

Railway stations opened in 1914
Railway stations in Sabah